The Rabbi Dr. I. Goldstein Synagogue is a synagogue on the Edmond J. Safra Givat Ram campus of the Hebrew University in Israel named in honor of Rabbi Israel Goldstein, an American-born Israeli rabbi, author, and Zionist leader.  Designed by two Israeli architects--the German-born Heinrich Heinz Rau and the Brazilian-born David Resnick--it has been listed as one of the "ten most beautiful synagogues in Israel," and called "without a doubt, a landmark in local architecture."

In 1964, the synagogue design was awarded the Rechter Prize by the Israeli Architects Association.

Site
The original site of Israel's Hebrew University was Mount Scopus, an area that was captured by Jordan during the 1947–1949 Palestine war.  Subsequently, Givat Ram was identified as the site of the new campus, with the area largely undeveloped by 1957, when the synagogue was built. The site has been described as "a largely bare, rocky plateau and each building sat on it almost as if in a desert."

The synagogue is located on Elyashar Street (Derekh Elyashar).

Funding
Much of the funding for the synagogue came from friends of Rabbi Goldstein, in honor of his 60th anniversary. At the April 1958 ceremony formally dedicating the new Givat Ram campus and opening 21 new campus building, Dr. George S. Wise, Chairman of the university's International Board of Governors, noted that the synagogue was one of ten buildings constructed with the help of donations from both organizations and individual donors in the U.S.

Design
The synagogue is 12.25 feet high, with an exterior in the shape of a "concrete hemisphere" on eight arches. The floor of the synagogue is a raised platform, and the interior has no windows, "yet in a sense is adorned by light, which ripples up from below on all sides." Within the domed worship space there is room for 100 worshippers. Separate sections for male and female worshipers are located on the same level, separated by a wooden screen.

The exterior design has been described as one that "takes the form of a gentle concrete puffball hovering just above the surface of the rock, rather as if it had been tossed there by the wind," with the suggestion that "the spiritual world (of the dome) passing silently around the temporal one (of the floor) without ever quite meeting it." A description linked to a 2005 retrospective of architect David Resnick noted that "It gives the impression of hovering in the air and being rooted in the ground at the same time - a totally modernistic building that exploits new technologies, but evokes local historical associations. While very different from the buildings around it, it blends in amazingly well."

One article on "25 beautiful synagogues worldwide" describes the synagogue as mushroom-shaped, and yet at the same time "other-worldly." "It is meant to look organic, natural, and imperfect, as though it just settled there one day."

Resnick has stated that Jerusalem is "a melancholy place," and it has been noted that the "fragility of the puff-ball synagogue" somehow expresses that vision.

Postage stamp
In 1975 the synagogue was featured in a series of Israeli postage stamps dedicated to "Architecture in Israel."

Consecration
The synagogue was consecrated on August 7, 1957.  Among the guests at the ceremony was Yitzhak Ben-Zvi, the President of Israel.

Remarks by Ben-Zvi and other Israeli officials praised Goldstein as a man of spirit and action, who had dedicated his life to the Jewish people.  As part of the ceremony, Joseph Klausner, professor emeritus at Hebrew University, opened the Torah ark.

Worship
Campus religious programs are coordinated by Hillel (the organization for "Jewish Campus Life") which has offices on the Mount Scopus campus.  Many services are held in the Hecht Synagogue on that campus, but because the location of the Goldstein synagogue is remote from the Givat Ram campus center for work and study no worship services are held on a regular basis. When services are held, morning services normally begin at 6:45am and evening services begin at the end of the school day, with the decision regarding nusach left to the voluntary prayer leader.

Special ceremonies and events
In 1961 a special ceremony was held at the synagogue to accept a Torah scroll contributed by a group of tourists from the United States. An Israeli representative from the Ministry of Religious Affairs (now renamed Ministry of Religious Services) participated in the ceremony, noting that this was one of 1500 Torah scrolls that have so far been collected from other nations (including many scrolls from communities destroyed during the Holocaust), but some 400 communities still needed Torah scrolls.

See also
Architecture of Israel
List of synagogues in Israel
Synagogue architecture

References

External links 
Map, Edmond J. Safra (Givat Ram) campus, Hebrew University

Synagogues in Jerusalem
Synagogues completed in 1957
Hebrew University of Jerusalem
1957 establishments in Israel